Events from the year 1517 in literature.

Events
August 6 – Belarusian printer Francysk Skaryna in Prague begins publishing The Psalter, a Bible translation into the Ruthenian language.
unknown dates
John of Hauville's Architrenius (c. 1184), a widely read Latin poem in 4,361 hexameters in nine books, is first printed by Jodocus Badius in Paris.
Niccolò Machiavelli writes L'asino (The [Golden] Ass) and (at about this date) the comedy Andria, adapted from Terence.

New books

Prose
Martin Luther – Ninety-five Theses (in Latin: Disputatio pro declaratione virtutis indulgentiarum)

Drama
Gil Vicente – A Trilogia das Barcas; part 1, Auto da Barca do Inferno

Poetry

Teofilo Folengo (as "Merlin Cocaio") – Opus Maccaronicum, including "Baldo" (satiric verses blending Latin and Italian dialects in hexameters)
John Skelton – The Tunnynge of Elynour Rummyng

Births
June 29 – Rembert Dodoens, Flemish botanist (died 1585)
July 25 – Jacques Pelletier du Mans, French humanist poet and mathematician (died 1582)
unknown date – Robert Crowley, English printer, poet, polemicist and Protestant clergyman (died 1588)
probable – Henry Howard, English nobleman and poet (died 1547)

Deaths
June 19 – Luca Pacioli, Italian mathematician, second person to publish a work on the double-entry system of book-keeping (born c.1447)
August – Andrea Ammonio, Italian, Latin-language poet (sweating sickness; born 1478)

References

1517

1517 books
Years of the 16th century in literature